Tremorine is a drug which is used in scientific research to produce tremor in animals. This is used for the development of drugs for the treatment of Parkinson's disease, as tremor is a major symptom which is treated by anti-Parkinson's drugs. Beta blockers are also effective in counteracting the effects of tremorine.

History 
Tremorine was first reported by Everett et al. in 1956-57.

References

See also 
 Oxotremorine

Parkinson's disease
Alkyne derivatives
Pyrrolidines